Shabab Al Ahli, is an Emirati professional basketball team located in Dubai. 
The team has competed in both the domestic UAE National Basketball League as well as the international FIBA Asia Champions Cup.

Achievements
UAE National League champion: 2014, 2015, 2016, 2017, 2018, 2019

Notable players
To appear in this section a player must have either:
- Set a club record or won an individual award as a professional player.
- Played at least one official international match for his senior national team at any time.
 Qais Alshabebi
 Maik Zirbes
 Kaspars Cipruss

Sponsorship 
Dubai Silicon Oasis Authority has been the team's official jersey sponsor.

References

External links
Profile at FIBA Asia Champions Cup 2017
Profile at Asia-basket.com

Al Ahli Club (Dubai)
Basketball teams in the United Arab Emirates
Basketball teams established in 1958
Sport in Dubai